The Gudelacksee is a German lake in Lindow, in the county of Ostprignitz-Ruppin, Brandenburg. It has an elevation of 52 metre and a surface area of 4.38 km².

Lakes of Brandenburg
Ostprignitz-Ruppin
LGudelacksee